In electrical engineering, electrical terms are associated into pairs called duals.  A dual of a relationship is formed by interchanging voltage and current in an expression. The dual expression thus produced is of the same form, and the reason that the dual is always a valid statement can be traced to the duality of electricity and magnetism.

Here is a partial list of electrical dualities:

 voltage – current
 parallel – serial (circuits)
 resistance – conductance
 voltage division – current division
 impedance – admittance
 capacitance – inductance
 reactance – susceptance
 short circuit – open circuit
 Kirchhoff's current law – Kirchhoff's voltage law.
 Thévenin's theorem – Norton's theorem

History 
The use of duality in circuit theory is due to Alexander Russell who published his ideas in 1904.

Examples

Constitutive relations 

 Resistor and conductor (Ohm's law)

 

 Capacitor and inductor – differential form

 

 Capacitor and inductor – integral form

Voltage division — current division

Impedance and admittance 

 Resistor and conductor

 

 

 Capacitor and inductor

See also 
 Duality (electricity and magnetism)
 Duality (mechanical engineering)
 Dual impedance
 Dual graph
 List of dualities

References 

 Turner, Rufus P, Transistors Theory and Practice, Gernsback Library, Inc, New York, 1954, Chapter 6.

Electrical engineering
Electrical circuits